Nicholas Harrison (born 18 October 1970) is an Australian former long-distance runner. He competed in the men's marathon at the 2004 Summer Olympics.

References

External links
 

1970 births
Living people
Athletes (track and field) at the 2004 Summer Olympics
Australian male long-distance runners
Australian male marathon runners
Olympic athletes of Australia
Athletes from Melbourne
21st-century Australian people